Modern Toss is a partly animated British comedy programme based on characters from Modern Toss, the creation of British comedy writers and cartoonists Jon Link and Mick Bunnage. Renowned for their scurrilous humour and highly stylised animation, it was created in 2004, initially as a website publishing single panel jokes and then as series of irregularly released comics.

The initial pilot programme was commissioned by Channel 4 as part of their Comedy Lab series and broadcast on 10 May 2005. Series one was first broadcast between 11 July to 15 August 2006. Following the DVD release of the first series in November 2007, a second series was shown between 23 January and 27 February 2008.

The show features the voices of Lee Kern, Mackenzie Crook, Simon Greenall, Paul Kaye, Doon Mackichan, Lucy Scott, Anthony Davis, David Schall and Ralph Brown.

The show was aired on the Independent Film Channel (IFC) in the United States and in 30+ territories including Canada, Australia, New Zealand, Russia, Poland, Finland, Ukraine, Italy, Mexico, Norway, Sweden, Slovenia, Croatia, Serbia, Montenegro, Bosnia Herzegovina, Macedonia, Philippines, Bulgaria, Iceland and the African territories reached by MNet. The series last played in the United Kingdom on 4Music in 2011 and the pilot episode received an airing on Channel 4 in August 2012.

Characters

The following recurring cartoons appear regularly in the programme:

Alan: the figurehead of Modern Toss, Alan is a cartoon scrawl who repeatedly sabotages his middle-class friends' get-togethers, resulting in his fleeing, pursued by "Roger", shouting, "Come back, Alan, you wanker!"
Accident & Emergency/Citizens Advice/Customer Services: members of the public ask a patient woman at a help-desk bizarre and often ridiculous questions. Contains the recurring theme of an angry Texan yelling into the phone, complaining profanely about a recently purchased cheeseburger, and who appears in every segment, regardless of the topic.
Barney: a man who periodically turns into a red Incredible Hulk-like monster at the mention of Alan Titchmarsh, and causes destruction in a mad rage, followed by embarrassment at what he has done.
Drive-By Abuser: a blunt moped-rider who "considers" various things before hurling profane abuse at them.
Cheese and Wine: a person at a party asks someone a question, and the other replies in a coarse and aggressive manner.
Fly Talk: a pair of flies discuss goings-on, often involving being trapped in a celebrity's car/house/hat and witnessing unexpected behaviour (such as David Attenborough urinating on his open fire).
Gnat Burglar: a giant gnat which sucks the entire contents out of things and injects it into other things.
I Live 'Ere: a West Country farmer recounts his violent assaults on trespassing (English) members of the public.
Illegal Alphabet: a large number of human-sized letters that congregate in a field to form rude words (including odd portmanteaus such as "pipecock"); they are then ambushed by truncheon-wielding police. These scenes end with a Radio 4-style voiceover announcement, for example: "That was Illegal Alphabet in 'illegal piss meeting' followed by 'unauthorised shitcasket'".
Mr Tourette - Master Signwriter: a gruff Frenchman who creates inappropriate signs (more often than not, with a sexual leaning) for bewildered customers.
Peace & Quiet: a man who seeks peace and quiet in his garden, but is plagued by noise from  neighbours and others nearby.
Planet Chat: a Jerry Springer-style talk show in which the Moon and several other celestial bodies argue, usually turning on the Earth in the end.
Prince Edward, Royal Entrepreneur: rarely seen in the programme, Prince Edward tries to profit from (often tasteless) Royalty-related merchandise.
Seawalker: another infrequent feature of series - a man with very long legs walks out of the sea onto the beach, whereupon a leg is severed by people playing frisbee.
Sneezeman: a little man with a huge nose who experiences uncontrollable sneezing fits, usually injuring himself and causing extensive damage to property.
Space Argument: two inept astronauts who disagree while carrying out routine space-related tasks.
Underground Wolf Gobbler: a giant semi-human monster that pops up out of the ground and eats things, i.e. trains or oncoming traffic.
Work: an unenthusiastic employee expresses his unwillingness to come in, or do any work.

The theme music is the brindisi, "Libiamo ne' lieti calici", from La Traviata by Giuseppe Verdi.

Broadcast history
UK
Channel 4 (2005 pilot, S1 2006, S2 2008)
Adult Swim segment on Bravo (2006–09)
Paramount Comedy 2 (2008–10)
4Music (2010–11)
Australia
ABC2 (2008, 2009, 2010)
Russia
2x2 (2008)
USA
IFC (2009)
Finland
SubTV (2010)
Mexico
Once TV (2010)

External links
 

2000s British television sketch shows
2006 British television series debuts
2008 British television series endings
British adult animated comedy television series
English-language television shows
British television series with live action and animation
Channel 4 sketch shows